A closed platform, walled garden, or closed ecosystem is a software system wherein the carrier or service provider has control over applications, content, and/or media, and restricts convenient access to non-approved applicants or content. This is in contrast to an open platform, wherein consumers generally have unrestricted access to applications and content.

Overview
For example, in telecommunications, the services and applications accessible on a cell phone on any given wireless device were formerly tightly controlled by the mobile operators. The operators limited the applications and developers that were available on users' home portals and home pages. Thus, a service provider might restrict user access to users whose account exhausted the pre-paid money on their account. This has long been a central issue constraining the telecommunications sector, as developers face huge hurdles in making their applications available to end-users.

In a more extreme example, the regulated 1970s American telephone system, Bell, owned all the hardware (including all phones) and had indirect control over the information sent through their infrastructure. It was an open government-sanctioned natural monopoly regulated by the Communications Act of 1934. However, in the landmark case Hush-A-Phone v. United States, Bell unsuccessfully sued a company producing plastic telephone attachments.

More generally, a walled garden can refer to a closed or exclusive set of information services provided for users. Similar to a real walled garden, a user is unable to escape this closed environment except through the designated entry/exit points or if the walls are removed.

Aspects 
A 2008 Harvard Business School working paper, entitled "Opening Platforms: How, When and Why?", differentiated a platform's openness/closedness by four aspects and gave example platforms:

Examples 
Some examples of walled gardens include:
 In the 1990s, AOL developed what later was called its "walled garden" model of service. The idea was to preferentially offer sponsored content to users when possible. During this period, CBS paid to provide sports content, ABC paid to provide news, and 1-800-Flowers paid to be the default florist for anyone seeking one. This strategy became AOL's first good method for selling advertisements. In its time, this method was highly profitable to AOL.
 Amazon's Kindle line of eReaders. As an October 2011 Business Insider article, entitled "How Amazon Makes Money From The Kindle" observes: "Amazon's Kindle is no longer just a product: It's a whole ecosystem." Moreover, as Business Insider noted "The Kindle ecosystem is also Amazon's fastest-growing product and could account for more than 10% of the company's revenue next year."
 Apple iOS and other mobile devices, which are restricted to running pre-approved applications from a digital distribution service.
 Barnes & Noble's Nook devices. In late December 2011, B&N began pushing the automatic, over-the-air firmware update 1.4.1 to Nook Tablets that removed users' ability to gain root access to the device and the ability to sideload applications from sources other than the official Barnes and Noble NOOK Store (without modding). Nook HD devices were similarly "closed", until May 2013, when BN opened its ecosystem somewhat by permitting users to install the Google Play Store and the various Android apps offered there, including those of rivals, such as Audible.com, ComiXology, Kindle, Kobo, and Google itself.
 The Encrypted Media Extensions specification provides APIs to control playback of encrypted content. This is part of the World Wide Web Consortium's web standards and was authored by members working from Google, Microsoft and Netflix.
  Kwangmyong, the national intranet service that operates in North Korea. It operates as a "walled garden" network, as no information is permitted to enter the network without government approval.
 Verizon Wireless' CDMA network and policies effectively prohibiting activation of non-Verizon sanctioned devices on their network. Verizon Wireless is frequently noted (and often criticized) for this practice.
 Permissioned blockchains have been called the “walled gardens” of 2017.
 Video game consoles have a long history of walled gardens, with developers needing to purchase licences to develop for the platform, and, in some cases, needing editorial approval from the console manufacturer prior to publishing games.
 Super-apps such as WeChat have been called walled gardens by critics.
 Owning Walled Garden after 3rd Party Cookie Era

See also 
 Data portability
 Vendor lock-in
 Business ecosystem
 Damaged good
 Dark web
 Defective by Design
 Digital rights management
 Gated community
 Hardware restriction
 Open source
 Software protection dongle
 User registration

References 

Application programming interfaces
Computing platforms
Hardware restrictions